Dimitrios "Dimitris" Giovanakis (born 21 August 1986 in Chios, Greece) is a Greek football player.

References

1986 births
Living people
Greek footballers
Association football defenders
Aiolikos F.C. players
Sportspeople from Chios